Alfaroa williamsii is a tropical monoecious cloud forest dwelling species of tree first recognized in the Cordillera Central of Nicaragua at an altitude of 1.3 km.  The mature tree is 15–25 m in height, with a 0.5 m DBH. The sub-opposite to alternate pinnately compound leaves bear three to five opposite to sub-opposite pairs of coriaceous leaflets, glabrous above and covered with minute scales below.  The pollen is born on panicles consisting of several erect catkins. The small, nearly round, glabrous, ribbed fruits are born on a sparsely flowered spike.

The sub-species A. williamsii subsp. tapantiensis has been recognized by D. Stone.

References and external links

Antonio Molina R. "Two New Nicaraguan Juglandaceae" Fieldiana:  Botany 31(16), Field Museum of Natural History, Chicago, IL. 357–359.

williamsii